823 Sisigambis is an asteroid belonging to the Flora family in the Main Belt. Its diameter is about 17 km and it has an albedo of 0.179. Its rotation period is unknown but appears to be greater than at least 12 hours. The asteroid is named after Sisygambis, the mother of Darius III of Persia.

References

External links 
 
 

000823
Discoveries by Max Wolf
Named minor planets
000823
19160331